Zsolt Lőw (born 29 April 1979) is a Hungarian professional football coach and former player who played as a defender. He was most recently an assistant coach at Premier League club Chelsea to Thomas Tuchel, whom he previously assisted at Paris Saint Germain. In his playing career, he played for Újpest, Energie Cottbus, Hansa Rostock, Hoffenheim, and Mainz 05.

Playing career
From 2009 until 2011, Lőw played for Mainz 05 under coach Thomas Tuchel.

Coaching career
Lőw started his coaching career a year later, in 2012, as assistant coach of Peter Zeidler at FC Red Bull Salzburg's farm team FC Liefering. When Adi Hütter joined Salzburg as coach in 2014, Lőw became his assistant until Hütter left for Bern. Salzburg won the Austrian double with the 2014–15 Austrian Football Bundesliga, and 2014–15 Austrian Cup. Lőw, at the same time, joined RB Leipzig, as one of the assistants to Ralf Rangnick. When Leipzig was promoted to the Bundesliga, Rangnick stopped being coach and hired Ralph Hasenhüttl as coach who continued to work with Lőw as his assistant. Leipzig finished as runner up in 2016–17 Bundesliga. The following season Leipzig dropped out of the Champions League and continued in the Europa League. After beating heavyweights Napoli and Zenit Saint Petersburg, they lost against Marseille in the quarter-finals.

In July 2018, when Hasenhüttl decided to leave Leipzig, Lőw left to join Thomas Tuchel as an assistant at Paris Saint Germain.

In December 2020, PSG sporting director Leonardo terminated Tuchel's contract. Tuchel's staff, including Lőw, were let go as well. Lőw went with Tuchel when the German was hired by Premier League club Chelsea the following month. He was in charge of Chelsea's Club World Cup semi-final as Tuchel was isolating after a positive COVID-19 test.

Career statistics
Reference:

Honours

Player
Újpest
 Hungarian Cup: 2001–02
 Hungarian Super Cup: 2002

1899 Hoffenheim
 2. Bundesliga runner-up: 2007–08
 Regionalliga runner-up: 2006–07

Mainz 05
 2. Bundesliga runner-up: 2008–09

References

External links
 
 Zsolt Lőw at magyarfutball.hu 

1979 births
Living people
Hungarian footballers
Association football defenders
Újpest FC players
FC Energie Cottbus players
FC Hansa Rostock players
TSG 1899 Hoffenheim players
1. FSV Mainz 05 players
Bundesliga players
2. Bundesliga players
Hungary international footballers
Hungarian expatriate footballers
Expatriate footballers in Germany
Hungarian expatriate sportspeople in France
Hungarian expatriate sportspeople in England
Association football coaches
Paris Saint-Germain F.C. non-playing staff
Chelsea F.C. non-playing staff
Footballers from Budapest